Dekeidoryxis is a genus of moths in the family Gracillariidae.

Etymology

Species
Dekeidoryxis asynacta (Meyrick, 1918) 
Dekeidoryxis khooi Kumata, 1989
Dekeidoryxis maesae Kumata, 1989

References

External links
Global Taxonomic Database of Gracillariidae (Lepidoptera)

Acrocercopinae
Gracillarioidea genera